The 1977 South American Championships in Athletics  were held in Montevideo, Uruguay, between 4 and 6 November 1977.

Medal summary

Men's events

Women's events

Medal table

External links
 Men Results – GBR Athletics
 Women Results – GBR Athletics
 Medallists

S
South American Championships in Athletics
South American Championships in Athletics
1977 in South American sport
International athletics competitions hosted by Uruguay